Itsuro Shimoda (Japanese:下田逸郎 (Shimoda Itsurō), born  Miyazaki, Japan) is a Japanese musician, singer, and composer. His style is characterized as Folk Pop, mixed with traditional Japanese styles. He was a member of the groups Shimonsai and Tokyo Kid Brothers. One of his biggest hits is Everybody Anyone, released with the album "Love songs and Lamentations" in 1973.

References

Living people
1948 births
Musicians from Miyazaki Prefecture
Japanese folk singers
Folk-pop singers
Japanese pop singers